Louis Barkhouse Flexner (January 7, 1902 – March 29, 1996) was an American biochemist, a researcher into the biochemistry of memory.
Flexner proved, among other things, that the brain synthesized proteins at a much faster rate than had been widely held before him. He also established a link between protein synthesis and the brain's functions of learning and memory.
Flexner was a member of the National Academy of Sciences, the founding director of the Institute of Neurological Sciences at the University of Pennsylvania, chair of anatomy at the University of Pennsylvania, a member of the American Academy of Arts and Sciences and a member of the American Philosophical Society.
The National Academies Press called him "a major scientific figure".

Awards and Distinctions 
 election to the National Academy of Sciences (1964)
 election to the American Academy of Arts and Sciences
 election to the American Philosophical Society
 a member of the American Society of Biological Chemists
 a member of the American Association of Anatomists (secretary-treasurer from 1956 to 1964
 The Democratic National Committee named him to a newly created Advisory Council on Technology in 1959
 served on scientific boards of the U.S. Public Health Service, United Cerebral Palsy Association, National Council to Combat Blindness, National Research Council, National Paraplegic Society, and the National Foundation for Infantile Paralysis
 the Weinstein Award in 1957
 In 1974 he was awarded an honorary degree (Doctor of Laws) by the University of Pennsylvania
 UPenn tribute established the Louis B. Flexner Lectureship

Career and life 
Flexner graduated from the University of Chicago with a B.S. degree in 1923 and from Johns Hopkins University with a M.D. degree in 1927.

References 

1902 births
1996 deaths
American biochemists
Members of the United States National Academy of Sciences
University of Chicago alumni
Johns Hopkins University alumni